Antonio Moreira Borges, better known as Father Antônio Maria (17 August 1945), is a Catholic priest and Brazilian singer, having performed in duets with Roberto Carlos, Agnaldo Rayol and Angela Maria, as well as a presentation for the then Pope John Paul II.

Biography

First years 
His parents were Portuguese, who arrived in Brazil in mid-1928, the couple Francisco and Mavília. They settled in the neighborhood of Magalhães Bastos, Rio de Janeiro, and had 5 children, but 2 died before 1 year of age, the other 3 were Carmelina, Eduardo and Antônio. According to Father Antônio Maria, he says he is "half Brazilian, half Portuguese".

Antonio and his family lived a humble life, lived with his grandmother Maria and grandfather Manuel, until 1948, when they finished building a home. Antonio studied at Colégio Rosa da Fonseca.

Priesthood 
He was ordained as a priest on 25 September 1976 and in his early years as a priest he performed his missionary activity in Portugal. 

He spent many years in charge of the Works of Greater Love at Catarina Kentenich Educational Center, based in Jaraguá, São Paulo, but is now on his way to a new mission after spending a year in a sabbatical period in Mexico.

As a priest, who made a vow of poverty and therefore does not have institutions in his name, the Congregation itself took over the whole work of the orphanage, where Father Antonio Maria has three adopted children. Now, the priest lives in Extrema, Minas Gerais, or in Jacareí, in São Paulo, where the sisters of the new project work on the construction of a convent. "Of course humanly speaking, I miss it, but God is filling with other works that we are doing," he told the Mundo Lusíada.

Antônio Maria has since worked at the Filhas de Maria Foundation – Servas dos Pequeninos, with his mother-house in Minas Gerais, and branches in other states.

Despite the changes, the priest continues to count on the friendship and affection of the Portuguese community.

Discography

 1982 – A Esperança Tem Voz
 1984 – Tempo de Paz
 1993 – 99
 1994 – Foi Deus
 1994 – Pássaro Liberto
 1999 – Festa da Fé
 2000 – Mensageiro do Amor
 2001 – Apenas um Menino
 2002 – Missão Divina
 2003 – No Mar De Maria
 2004 – Com Vida 2007 – Benedito Bento do Brasil 2010 – Prisioneiro do Amor 2015 – Mais Perto 2015 – Peregrina Do Evangelho''

References

External links
 https://www.padreantoniomaria.com.br/

1945 births
Living people
Brazilian Roman Catholic singers
20th-century Brazilian Roman Catholic priests
Musicians from Rio de Janeiro (city)
Brazilian people of Portuguese descent
21st-century Brazilian Roman Catholic priests